Leptophloeus is a genus of beetles in the family Laemophloeidae, containing the following species:

 Leptophloeus abei Sasaji
 Leptophloeus alternans Erichson
 Leptophloeus angustulus LeConte
 Leptophloeus anormus Grouvelle
 Leptophloeus ater Lefkovitch
 Leptophloeus axillaris Wollaston
 Leptophloeus bupleuri Peyerimhof
 Leptophloeus capitus Lefkovitch
 Leptophloeus cassavae Lefkovitch
 Leptophloeus clematidis Erichson
 Leptophloeus convexiusculus Grouvelle
 Leptophloeus cornutus Lefkovitch
 Leptophloeus femoralis Sasaji
 Leptophloeus foveicollis Sasaji
 Leptophloeus hypobori Perris
 Leptophloeus janeti Grouvelle
 Leptophloeus juniperi Grouvelle
 Leptophloeus linearis Grouvelle
 Leptophloeus lucidus Grouvelle
 Leptophloeus mobilis Grouvelle
 Leptophloeus mucunae Lefkovitch
 Leptophloeus opaculus Grouvelle
 Leptophloeus parallelus Lefkovitch
 Leptophloeus perrisi Grouvelle
 Leptophloeus problematicus Lefkovitch
 Leptophloeus punctatus Lefkovitch
 Leptophloeus stenoides Wollaston

References

Laemophloeidae
Cucujoidea genera